In category theory, a span, roof or correspondence  is a generalization of the notion of relation between two objects of a category. When the category has all pullbacks (and satisfies a small number of other conditions), spans can be considered as morphisms in a category of fractions.

The notion of a span is due to Nobuo Yoneda  (1954) and Jean Bénabou (1967).

Formal definition 
A span is a diagram of type  i.e., a diagram of the form .

That is, let Λ be the category (-1 ← 0 → +1). Then a span in a category C is a functor S : Λ → C. This means that a span consists of three objects X, Y and Z of C and morphisms f : X → Y and g : X → Z: it is two maps with common domain.

The colimit of a span is a pushout.

Examples 

 Any object yields the trivial span A ← A → A, where the maps are the identity.
 More generally, let  be a morphism in some category. There is a trivial span A ← A → B, where the left map is the identity on A, and the right map is the given map φ.
 If M is a model category, with W the set of weak equivalences, then the spans of the form  where the left morphism is in W, can be considered a generalised morphism (i.e., where one "inverts the weak equivalences"). Note that this is not the usual point of view taken when dealing with model categories.

Cospans 

A cospan K in a category C is a functor K : Λop → C; equivalently, a contravariant functor from Λ to C. That is, a diagram of type  i.e., a diagram of the form .

Thus it consists of three objects X, Y and Z of C and morphisms f : Y → X and g : Z → X: it is two maps with common codomain.

The limit of a cospan is a pullback.

An example of a cospan is a cobordism W between two manifolds M and N, where the two maps are the inclusions into W. Note that while cobordisms are cospans, the category of cobordisms is not a "cospan category": it is not the category of all cospans in "the category of manifolds with inclusions on the boundary", but rather a subcategory thereof, as the requirement that M and N form a partition of the boundary of W is a global constraint.

The category nCob of finite-dimensional cobordisms is a dagger compact category.  More generally, the category Span(C) of spans on any category C with finite limits is also dagger compact.

See also 
 Binary relation
 Pullback (category theory)
 Pushout (category theory)
 Cobordism

References
 
Yoneda, Nobuo,  On the homology theory of modules.  J. Fac. Sci. Univ. Tokyo Sect. I,7  (1954), 193–227.
Bénabou, Jean, Introduction to Bicategories, Lecture Notes in Mathematics 47, Springer (1967), pp.1-77

Functors